Selhurst Park is a football stadium in Selhurst in the London Borough of Croydon which is the home ground of Premier League side Crystal Palace. The stadium was designed by Archibald Leitch and opened in 1924. It has hosted international football as well as games for the 1948 Summer Olympics, and was shared by Charlton Athletic from 1985 to 1991 and Wimbledon from 1991 to 2003.

History
In 1922, a former brickfield site was bought from the London, Brighton and South Coast Railway Company for £2,750 by Crystal Palace F.C. The club had been pursuing a deal for the ground as early as 25 February 1919. The stadium designed by Scottish stadium architect Archibald Leitch, was constructed by Humphreys of Kensington (a firm regularly used by Leitch) for around £30,000, and officially opened by the Lord Mayor of London on 30 August 1924. There was then only one stand, the present Main Stand, but this was unfinished due to industrial action; Crystal Palace played The Wednesday and lost 0–1 in front of 25,000 fans.

Two years later, on St David's Day in 1926, England played Wales in an international at the stadium. England amateur matches and various other finals were also staged there, as were other sports including boxing, bicycle polo (in the late 1940s) and cricket and music concerts (in the 1980s). In addition to this, it hosted two games for the 1948 Summer Olympics.

In 1953, the stadium's first floodlights were installed consisting of numerous poles around the 3 sides of terracing and four roof mounted installations on the Main Stand, but were replaced nine years later by floodlights mounted on pylons in each corner and six installations on the Main Stand roof. Real Madrid marked the occasion by playing under the new set of bulbs – a real footballing coup at the time for third division Palace, as it was Real's first ever match in London.

The ground remained undeveloped until 1969, when Palace were promoted to Division One (then the highest tier of English football) for the first time. The Arthur Wait Stand was built, named after the club's long-serving chairman, who was a builder by trade and was often seen working on the site himself. Arthur Wait was notable for overseeing Palace's rise from the Fourth to the First Division in the 1960s. The Whitehorse Lane end was given a new look when a "second tier" of terracing, brick-built refreshments and toilets were provided along the top.

The Safety of Grounds Act required the Holmesdale Road terrace (the preferred stand for the Crystal Palace supporters) to be split into three sections for safety reasons. The remaining poorer facilities were mainly where opposition supporters were situated. New facilities were subsequently built at the back of the Holmesdale Stand. In the summer of 1981, the Main Stand terraced enclosure was redesigned and refitted with seating. This year also saw Palace sell the back of the Whitehorse Lane terrace and adjacent land to supermarket retailer Sainsbury's for £2m, to help their financial problems. The size of the terrace at this end was effectively halved.

Charlton Athletic moved into the stadium as temporary tenants in 1985, and became with Palace the first league clubs in England to agree such a ground-sharing scheme. The following year, chairman Ron Noades purchased the stadium from the club as a means of raising revenue. In the summer of 1990, the lower half of the Arthur Wait Stand was converted into all-seater with the assistance of Football Trust Grant Aid, following the Taylor Report into the Hillsborough Disaster. Two rows of executive boxes (48 in total) were constructed above the Whitehorse Lane terrace (on the roof of Sainsbury's supermarket) in 1991 and this was subsequently roofed and made all-seater in the summer of 1993.

Charlton moved back to The Valley via West Ham's Boleyn Ground, and Wimbledon F.C. replaced them as tenants in 1991. The Holmesdale terrace was demolished in 1994 and replaced a year later with a two-tiered 8,500 capacity stand. The roof cladding of the main stand was also replaced, the previous one having started to leak. Some 25 years on, this remains the most recent major work to be carried out at Selhurst Park.

When Mark Goldberg bought Crystal Palace, he bought just the club. Former Palace chairman Ron Noades retained ownership of the Selhurst Park ground, having purchased it from the club in 1986. Simon Jordan took out a ten-year lease on the ground upon his purchase of Crystal Palace in 2000, and Noades received rent from the club. When Wimbledon relocated to Milton Keynes in 2003, a section of their fans had already decamped to the newly established AFC Wimbledon in protest, when the old club were given permission by the FA to move in 2002.

Palace chairman Jordan stated that he had completed a purchase of the freehold of Selhurst Park from Altonwood Limited (Ron Noades' company) for £12m in October 2006. However, Jordan never owned the freehold or had any interest in it and his reasons for claiming he had bought it are unknown. Ownership was in fact held by Selhurst Park Limited, a joint venture between HBOS and the Rock property empire owned by Paul Kemsley, a former director of Tottenham Hotspur. In April 2008, a 25-year lease was granted to Crystal Palace at an annual rent of £1.2m.

The Rock Group went into administration in June 2009, the management of the freehold was taken on by PwC acting on behalf of Lloyds Bank, which now own HBOS. PwC expected to sell it within two years. The club and Selhurst Park stadium were purchased by the CPFC 2010 consortium in June 2010, leading to the stadium and Football Club being united in a company for the first time since 1998.

January 2011 saw CPFC 2010 announce plans to redevelop the Crystal Palace National Sports Centre, the club's original home, in five years' time. However, opposition from Crystal Palace residents and Bromley council have seen the plans become increasingly infeasible, resulting in suggestions  that Selhurst Park should be redeveloped gradually similar to the Molineux stadium (home to Wolves).

In June 2012, Crystal Palace co-chairman Steve Parish approached Rugby Union team London Welsh about a possible ground-share. London Welsh's promotion to the English Premiership was in doubt, as their plans to play their matches at Kassam Stadium were deemed unsuitable by the RFU.

In 2018, the club announced that a £100m renovation of Selhurst Park was imminent, to bring it closer in terms of quality to modern Premier League grounds. Selhurst Park was used in the Apple TV+ series Ted Lasso as Nelson Road, the fictional home stadium of AFC Richmond.

The stands

Holmesdale Road Stand 
Capacity of stand: 8,329

The Holmesdale is a double-tiered stand (Lower tier 5,510, Upper tier 2,819). Built in 1994, this is the newest stand in the stadium, replacing the previous terrace end. It forms the South East end of the stadium.

Arthur Wait Stand 
Capacity of stand: 9,574

Part of this stand seats the away supporters (approx. 3,000). It was opened in 1969, and named after the then Palace chairman. It forms the North East side of the stadium.

Main Stand 
Capacity of stand: 5,460 + Press Seats (63)

This original stand opened in 1924 forms the South West side of the stadium. It includes the Directors Box, and new offices/Main Entrance that were built at the rear of the stand during the 1990s. The exterior of the stand has been re-cladded in white replacing the old original blue painted corrugated iron. New seats were also installed during the summer of 2013, including several lounges/Bars and a restaurant situated within the stand. With new investment confirmed, the club put forward plans for this stand to be redeveloped into a three-tier structure, building over, then removing, the current stand. Plans for a new 13,500-seater Main Stand (extending overall stadium capacity to 34,000) were approved at a Croydon Council meeting on 19 April 2018. The new stand will feature an all-glass frontage, inspired by the original Crystal Palace. The club had planned for the work to start in summer 2019 with the new stand to be ready in time for the 2021–22 season, but as of today the work has still to commence.

Whitehorse Lane Stand  

Capacity of stand: 2,219 + seating for executive boxes (480)

Originally built as a standing terrace, it was redeveloped in the early 1980s. It is also known as the Family Stand for Crystal Palace supporters.
The stand includes 24 luxury Executive Boxes. It forms the North West end of the stadium.

Attendance

Average

Records 
The record attendance at Selhurst Park was achieved in 1979 when 51,482 people saw Crystal Palace defeat Burnley 2–0 to clinch the Football League Second Division championship title. The ground also holds the record for Division Four (now League Two in the English football pyramid) attendance when Crystal Palace played local rivals Millwall in 1961 after 37,774 people turned out for the game.

Selhurst Park recorded the lowest attendance for a Premier League game – 3,039 for Wimbledon v. Everton on 26 January 1993. The game finished 3–1 to Everton.

See also
List of English football stadia by capacity

References

External links

 Stadium information at Crystal Palace FC official website
 Stadium picture

Venues of the 1948 Summer Olympics
Olympic football venues
Crystal Palace F.C.
Wimbledon F.C.
Football venues in London
Buildings and structures in the London Borough of Croydon
Premier League venues
Tourist attractions in the London Borough of Croydon
Sports venues completed in 1924
English Football League venues
1924 establishments in England